Thornberry Animal Sanctuary is a medium-sized animal rescue and welfare charity, located in Rotherham, South Yorkshire, England. It is an animal sanctuary and shelter, providing temporary shelter and permanent care for pets and farm animals, adhering to a non-destruction policy.

Information 
Thornberry was founded in 1988 by Steve Bamford, who sold his home to buy the land on which the sanctuary stands; turning his childhood hobby of rescuing and caring for animals into his life's work. Bamford lived in a small caravan for 5 years, without electricity, heating, running water or sanitation whilst the sanctuary was established. The main sanctuary site in North Anston initially took up , containing kennels, cattery, stables, and barn. The stables later moved to Birks Farm in Worksop, but that facility was sold again, and the stables are now at Silverthorpe Farm in Ravenfield.

Bamford won the 2004 IFAW/The People Animal Action Award for Commitment. But he is no longer formally affiliated with the charity, having left following allegations of financial mismanagement in connection with the Birks Farm sale and Silverthorpe Farm purchase. The organization itself, however, was cleared of any serious misconduct by the Charity Commission.

Thornberry Animal Sanctuary ("Caring for animals since 1988") is owned and managed by a Management Committee.
The charity is not funded by the government and is financed by donations and fund-raising events.
The sanctuary has a small number of paid staff to help with the welfare of the animals; it is otherwise mainly run by volunteers.

The sanctuary is open for visitors for a few hours every day; there is a small entrance fee on weekends.

Thornberry Animal Sanctuary (TAS) has formed up with a new pub in Dinnington Monk's Bridge Farm they bring animals to the pub to show customers and to help with fund raising.

See also
 List of animal sanctuaries

Notes
 Appeal over dumped pets, BBC News, 2004-01-05
 They're Grreight: Meet the winners of our top Animal Action Awards, The People, 2004-08-22
 Pet charity is cleared of wrongdoing, The Star (Sheffield), 2006-04-29
 Animal charity gets the all-clear, BBC News, 2006-05-02
 Walkers take the lead to raise funds for animal sanctuary, The Star (Sheffield), 2006-07-03
 The rise and fall of horse-mad Steve Bamford, Dinnington Guardian, 2007-11-26

External links
 Thornberry Website

Animal sanctuaries
Animal charities based in the United Kingdom
Dinnington, South Yorkshire
Charities based in South Yorkshire